Vincent Keter (born 11 March 2002) is a Kenyan middle-distance runner who specializes in the 1500 metres. He was the gold medallist at the World Athletics U20 Championships in 2021.

References

External links 

 Vincent Keter at World Athletics

2002 births
Living people
Kenyan male middle-distance runners
World Athletics U20 Championships winners